Samael is an Angelic figure in Talmudic lore.

Samael may also refer to:
 Samael (band), a Swiss symphonic black/industrial metal band
 Samael Aun Weor, founder of the International Gnostic Movement
Lucifer (DC Comics) (Lucifer Samael Morningstar), a DC Comics character 
 Sammael, a fictional character in the Wheel of Time novels by Robert Jordan
 Samael, the vampiric proprietor of Cafe Ankh in the video game Discworld Noir
 Sammael, a demonic creature featured in the film Hellboy

See also
 Samiel, a supernatural character in Carl Maria von Weber's 1821 opera Der Freischütz